David Meece's fifth album, Front Row was recorded live in 1982.

Track listing 

"Heaven Knows" (Dan Walsh, Harvey Price) - 2:35
"Jesus" (Meece) - 4:31
"Rattle Me, Shake Me" (Nancy Honeytree) - 4:30
"Mother, Muffler, Mozart & The Beatles" - 6:28
 "Mozart Sonata A Minor 1st Movement" (Arrangement – Meece)
 "Sgt. Pepper's Lonely Heart's Club Band" (John Lennon, Paul McCartney)
"All The Time" (Meece) - 4:13
"Never Gonna Serve Anyone Else But You" (Meece) - 2:40
"Gospel Train" (Meece) - 3:05
"Comin' Back" (Meece) - 3:12
"Crucifixion" - (15:56)
 "There Once Lived A Man" (Meece) 
 "Intermezzo" (Meece) 
 "Ten Thousand Angels" (Ray Overholt)
 "The Bystander" (Meece) 
 "Were You There" (Meece) 
 "We Are The Reason" (Meece)

Personnel 
 David Meece – lead vocals, acoustic piano
 Shane Keister – keyboards, synthesizers
 Jon Goin – guitar
 Brent Rowan – guitar
 Craig Nelson – bass
 Keith Edwards – drums
 Farrell Morris – percussion
 Mark Morris – percussion
 Billy Puett – saxophone, woodwinds
 Buddy Skipper – saxophone
 Denis Solee – saxophone, woodwinds
 Roger Bissell – trombone
 George Tidwell – trumpet
 Kim Fleming – backing vocals
 Donna McElroy – backing vocals
 Glenda Smith White – backing vocals

Production
 Producer – Brown Bannister
 Executive Producer – Michael Blanton
 Recorded by Malcolm Harper
 Engineer – Jack Joseph Puig
 Recorded live at Lincoln Center (Fort Collins, CO).
 Remixed by Bob Clark at Great Circle Sound (Nashville, TN).
 Mastered by Glenn Meadows at Masterfonics (Nashville, TN).
 Album Design – Barnes & Company
 Photography – Larry Dixon

David Meece albums
1982 live albums